Samrawit Mengsteab (born 15 April 1990) is an Eritrean-Swedish athlete. She competed in the women's 3000 metres event at the 2021 European Athletics Indoor Championships. Mengsteab represented Eritrea until 31 March 2017. From 2 November 2018 she is eligible to represent Sweden.

References

External links
 

1990 births
Living people
Eritrean female middle-distance runners
Swedish female middle-distance runners
Swedish people of Eritrean descent
Swedish sportspeople of African descent
Place of birth missing (living people)